Annasif Døhlen (23 June 1930 – 5 January 2021) was a Norwegian sculptor. She was born in Stavanger to sculptor Aimée Døhlen and Herman Døhlen.

Among her works are portraits of Johan Scharffenberg, Håkon Bleken and David Monrad Johansen, and a sculpture of Olav V of Norway, Skiglede, placed at the Holmenkollen ski arena. Other public sculptures are Ikaros from 1967 at Bygdøy, Oslo, a statue of Vangsgutane, raised in Todalen, Møre, and Plankbærarn in Hommelvik, from 1999. She is represented in the National Gallery of Norway and Riksgalleriet.

References

1930 births
2021 deaths
People from Stavanger
Norwegian sculptors
Norwegian women sculptors